Crystal Nicole Johnson, sometimes credited as Cristyle is an American recording artist, singer, and songwriter who signed her first deal with So So Def/EMI Music in 2007. Crystal Nicole signed with Blackground Records/ Interscope Records in October 2010 and released her first single "Pinch Me", produced by Jermaine Dupri and Bryan-Michael Cox in June 2011. In 2015 Crystal independently released a 7-song EP titled "Masterpiece" along with an official music video.

Career
Nicole was born and raised in Atlanta, Georgia. She started singing at different talent shows and open mics in Atlanta and wrote her first song at the age of ten.

As a songwriter, Crystal has written songs for Girlicious, Janet Jackson, Jennifer Lopez, Keke Palmer, Teyana Taylor, Tiffany Evans, Chilli, Natasha Bedingfield, Wonder Girls, Rihanna, and Jessica Sanchez. She has co-written songs with Mariah Carey and wrote songs featured on the projects of Brandy, Ciara, Jennifer Hudson, and Beyoncé.

Awards and nominations

Discography

Albums
2015: Masterpiece (EP)

Singles
 2011: "Pinch Me"
 2013: "Sundown"
 2014 "Imagine"
 2014 "I Don't Belong to You"
 2014 "I'm All Yours"

Production and writing discography
Crystal has a list of songs that she has written or co-written on her Myspace page.

Crystal has also sung a number of demos and is accredited to other works in progress. (listed below).

 "Bread Crumbs"
 "Can't Stop"
 "Friend Like Me"
 "Good One Now"
 "Scared of Lonely" (Demo of Beyoncé's song)
 "Hard to Breathe" (Demo for Pussycat Dolls)
 "I Don't Wanna Love Ya"
 "I Just Love Ya"
 "In The Morning"
 "The Definition (Demo of Brandy's song)"
 "Only Girl (In The World)" (Demo of Rihanna's song)

See also
Grammy Award

References

External links

Living people
African-American women singer-songwriters
Grammy Award winners
1983 births
21st-century African-American women singers